The Tour de la Nouvelle-France was a professional cycle race held as a stage race in Canada. It was first held in 1971 and held for the final time in 1972. It was won in both years by Guido Reybrouck. In 1972 it was part of the Super Prestige Pernod series.

Winners

References

Men's road bicycle races
Cycle races in Canada
Super Prestige Pernod races
Recurring sporting events established in 1971
Recurring sporting events disestablished in 1972
Defunct cycling races in Canada
1919 establishments in Canada
1983 disestablishments in Canada